Argyroeides auranticincta is a moth of the subfamily Arctiinae. It was described by Edward A. Klages in 1906. It is found in Venezuela.

References

Moths described in 1906
Argyroeides
Moths of South America